The Republic of Korea Marine Corps (ROKMC), also known as the ROK Marine Corps or ROK Marines, is the marine corps of South Korea. The ROKMC is a branch of the Republic of Korea Navy responsible for amphibious operations, and also functions as a rapid reaction force and a strategic reserve.

The ROKMC was founded as a suppression operations force against communist partisans in 1949, prior to the Korean War. The ROKMC also fought in combat during the Vietnam War.

The ROK Marine Corps, with 29,000 personnel, is organized into two divisions and two separate brigades under the Headquarters ROK Marine Corps. The ROK Marine Corps has about 300 tracked vehicles including assault amphibious vehicles, main battle tanks, and self-propelled artillery.

History

Founding years

On April 15, 1949, the Republic of Korea Marine Corps (ROKMC) was founded at Deoksan airfield in Jinhae with an initial strength of 380 men. Lieutenant Colonel Shin Hyun-joon was appointed to lead as the first Commandant of the newly formed Marine Corps and he was promoted to colonel on July 1, 1949. The ROKMC consisted of 2 rifle companies and a headquarters company equipped with many secondhand weapons from the Imperial Japanese Army (IJA) used during World War II, including the 7.7 mm Type 99 Light Machine Gun. It was soon reorganized into an infantry battalion with three rifle companies. Initially no United States Marine Corps (USMC) or United States Army advisers were attached to the unit and its doctrine and training was based on that of the IJA.

In September 1949 two rifle companies were sent to Jinju on anti-guerilla operations and in December the entire battalion was sent to Jeju-do for anti-guerilla operations following the Jeju Uprising. A 37mm anti-tank platoon was added to the battalion in this period.

Korean War
Following the start of the Korean War on 25 June 1950 the Kokilhun Marine rifle battalion was sent to Gunsan where they delayed the advance of the Korean People's Army (KPA) forces and earned the Marines the nickname of the Ghost Killers. The Marines were rapidly expanded to three battalions and redesignated as the 1st KMC Regiment and took part in fighting at Mokpo, Changhang, Chinjongri, Jinju, Namwom and Masan.

On 23 August the Marines landed on Kueje Island and fought a KPA force there until 15 September.

On the afternoon of 15 September the regiment landed at Red Beach, Inchon and was assigned the task of mopping up KPA forces in Inchon. The next day the USMC 5th and 1st Marine Regiments were ordered to move along the Inchon-Seoul highway and capture Kimpo Air Base. The 3rd KMC Battalion was assigned to protect the 5th Marines left flank and capture high ground near Ascom City west of Kimpo. On the morning of 17 September the 3rd KMC Battalion began clearing Ascom City, a two square mile maze of huts in which many KPA had taken shelter. The Ascom City area was eventually secured on 18 September On 19 September after advancing to the Han River near Seoul the 5th Marines were ordered to cross the Han near Haengju, seize Hill 125 and then move southeast along the railway lines. The 2nd KMC Battalion crossed the Han on Amphibious Tractors and occupied Hill 95 overlooking the crossing site. Meanwhile, the 3rd KMC Battalion at Kimpo called in airstrikes against a KPA unit forming up to try to retake the airfield. On 22 September the 1st KMC Battalion with the 3rd Battalion, 5th Marines and 1st Battalion, 5th Marines began advancing into Seoul, meeting heavy KPA resistance the 1st KMC was forced to retreat to its starting point. On 23 September the 1st KMC renewed their attack but were met by heavy fire losing 32 killed and 68 wounded. The 1st KMC was withdrawn into reserve and replaced by the 2nd KMC Battalion, while the 5th Marines eventually overran the KPA strongpoint on Hill 105S. On 25 September the USMC began their final assault on Seoul with the 2nd KMC assigned to the 1st Marines to move through the central city to the northeast while the 1st KMC assigned to the 5th Marines would seize the Capital Building and the northwest of the city. Meeting a stubborn defense from entrenched KPA forces the 7th Marine Regiment joined the battle on 26 September. By the afternoon of 28 September the center of the city had been cleared of KPA troops and on 29 September despite ongoing fighting in the suburbs the Government of Korea was formally reinstated in Seoul.

On 18 October the three KMC battalions were embarked on ships for the landing at Wonsan, eventually going ashore there on 25 October. On 2 November the Regiment was given responsibility for the zone south of the 39th Parallel. In late November the Regiment was attached to the U.S. 3rd Infantry Division. Following the attacks by the Chinese People's Volunteer Army (PVA) in the Battle of Chosin Reservoir the Regiment withdrew to Wonsan to cover the evacuation of United Nations Command (UN) Forces. Between 7 and 9 December the 1st and 3rd KMC Battalions were evacuated from Wonsan by ship, while on 15 December the 2nd and 5th KMC Battalions were evacuated by air from Hungnam. The Regiment reformed at Jinhae in mid-December.

After a period of rest and refitting, including training by USMC advisers, the Regiment was assigned to the 1st Marine Division in mid-January 1951. On 24 January the Regiment joined the 1st Marine Division which was conducting anti-guerilla operations against the KPA 10th Division. On 12 February the Regiment, less the 5th Battalion, was attached to the Republic of Korea Army (ROK) Capital Division at Samcheok. The 5th Battalion meanwhile was sent to Inchon and then occupied the Kimpo peninsula, it would operate independently from the Regiment until March 1952.

On 17 March 1951 as they participated in Operation Ripper the Regiment was permanently attached to the 1st Marine Division and the 3rd Battalion, 11th Marines was assigned to provide artillery support to the Regiment. Ripper was followed immediately by Operation Rugged and then Operation Dauntless in which the Regiment crossed the Bukhan River and captured the Hwacheon Dam. The Chinese Spring Offensive which started on 22 April was met with a strong defence by the 1st and 2nd KMC Battalions and the 5th Marines and by 23 April they had successfully repelled the PVA attacks. However, with neighbouring units withdrawing the Marines were ordered back to the high ground between the Soyang and Hongcheon Rivers. The advance made rapid progress and by the end of May the Regiment was on the south bank of the Hwacheon Reservoir where it was relieved on 2 June by the ROK 3rd Regiment.

On 4 June 1951 the Regiment was brought out of reserve to join the 1st Marine Division in an assault on the PVA/KPA main line of resistance along a mountain range extending from Yanggu to Hill 1316 (Daeamsan). The area was defended by a regiment of the KPA 12th Division with orders to hold the position until death. from 4 to 9 June the Regiment fought the KPA making limited progress. Finally on 10 June the Regiment commander Colonel Kim Tae Shik decided to make a night attack on the KPA positions. Launched at 02:00 on 11 June the attack caught the KPA unprepared and the Marines quickly overran Hill 1122 and the rest of the ridgeline. Following the capture of Daeamsan the Marines continued to push against the PVA/KPA to obtain better positions. On 15 June the 2nd KMC Battalion attacked north to Hill 1304 which it captured the next day. The 3rd KMC Battalion moved northwest and captured Dusol-san following which they dug in. On 7 July the Regiment was ordered to take Daeusan, beginning their attack on 8 July. After suffering over 220 casualties the attack was called off on 12 July.

The Regiment and the 1st Marine Division went into reserve and the Regiment received intensive training from USMC advisers. At the end of this period it was organized like a USMC regiment with three infantry battalions, a regimental headquarters, a 4.2-inch mortar company and a 75mm recoilless rifle platoon. Lieutenant Colonel Kim Dong Ha, who replaced the wounded Colonel Kim Tae Shik as Regiment commander.

On 27 August the 1st Marine Division and the Regiment returned to the frontline to lead the Battle of the Punchbowl ultimately gaining control of the line of hills north of the Punchbowl by 21 September.

Following the Battle of the Punchbowl the fighting stabilized into static warfare with numerous foot patrols far into PVA/KPA territory and company-strength tank-infantry raids. Throughout the remainder of 1951, the 1st Marine Division continued to occupy the eastern portion of the X Corps defense sector in east-central Korea. From left to right the 1st KMC Regiment, 7th Marines and 1st Marines held the main line of resistance with two battalions each. The 5th Marines remained in reserve until 11 November when it relieved the 1st Marines, which went into reserve. As Marines continued patrols and efforts to improve their defenses, the KMC added its own artillery support, the 1st Korean Artillery Battalion consisting of two medium (155mm) and two light (105mm) howitzer batteries.

In early 1952 the 2nd KMC Regiment, commanded by Lieutenant Colonel Kim Doo Chan, was organized as were engineer and medical companies. In the spring of 1952, the 1st Marine Division, along with the 1st KMC Regiment, received orders to move across the peninsula to western Korea. The regiment was the first unit to move to its new positions along the extreme left flank of the Eighth Army, where it was given the mission of guarding the approaches to Seoul along the Jamestown Line. By 24 March, the 1st Marine Division and 1st KMC Regiment had relieved elements of the ROK 1st Division along the left sector of the main line of resistance, adjacent to the 1st Commonwealth Division, and were in position to continue sector outpost security and ground defense in what had become a war of attrition.

On 20 March 1952 the 1st KMC Regiment assumed responsibility for its portion of the Jamestown Line between the Kimpo Provisional Regiment and the 1st Marines (replaced by the 5th Marines on 29 March. From 25 to 31 March the PVA made five separate probing attacks against the 1st KMC Regiment. On 1 April the KPA launched an attack on the 1st KMC positions in an attempt to capture the Freedom Gate Bridge over the Imjin River but were pushed back by dawn on 2 April. On 12–13 April the PVA increased their attacks by fire and infantry probes of the 1st Marine Division sector and on the night of 17 April launched an attack on the 1st KMC positions but this was beaten back with small arms and artillery fire with the 1st KMC losing two dead while the PVA lost 36 killed. On 23 and 24 April the 1st Marine Division withdrew from most of its outpost line reducing the vulnerability of these isolated positions and strengthening the main line of resistance.

On 5 May 1952, the Korean Marine Corps Tank Company was formed consisting of 181 men with 17 M4 Sherman tanks and one tank retriever. The company received its training in combat under the direction of USMC Company A, 1st Tank Battalion. The entire company was committed on 12 July to relieve Company A in support of the 1st KMC Regiment. Following a period of small unit actions along the main line of resistance, starting in August the 1st KMC participated in the Battle of Bunker Hill. On the night of 31 October 1952 as the 5th KMC Battalion was relieving the 3rd KMC Battalion on the right of the Regiment's position the PVA attacked the positions. Both Battalions held their positions and the PVA withdrew before dawn on 1 November leaving more than 295 dead.

In early May 1953 the 1st KMC Regiment went into reserve, returning to the frontline in July when it defended its positions against PVA probes during the Battle of the Berlin Outposts and Boulder City.

With the end of the war on 27 July 1953 the Korean Marines had killed an estimated 22,070 PVA/KPA while suffering 2,529 casualties.

In 1955, the 1st Marine Division was established.

Vietnam War and 1970s

South Korean President Park Chung Hee asked to participate in the Many Flags  program and sent military units into Vietnam, despite opposition from both the Assembly and the public. In exchange, the United States agreed to reimburse additional military budgets to South Korea to help modernize its armed forces, totaling about a billion dollars.

The three main units deployed to Vietnam were the ROKMC's Blue Dragon Brigade (Hanja: 靑龍; Cheongryeong), ROKA Capital Division and the White Horse Division. Various South Korean special forces units were also deployed. The Republic of Korea Army's Tactical Area of Responsibility was the southern half of the I Corps. The ROKMC was deployed with the I Corps, alongside U.S. Marines.

In 1974, Commander Lee Dong-Yong of the 1st Marine Division modified the 1st Division's infantry regiment to specialize its each of 3 battalions to Airborne/Amphibious Infiltration/Ranger. This system distinguishes the 1st Marine Division from other ROKMC divisions and brigades.

1980s
In 1982, ROKMC established the '812th "Hammer" Unit'. Their mission was to perform retaliation operations against the DPRK forces. The unit's motto was 'Kill'em all, Let God sort'em out'. Their training included a 10 km ruck march in an hour with full combat gear, and carrying a 100 kg IBS(Inflatable Boat Small) overhead. Training also included 12 km continuous sea swimming.

In November 1987, the Headquarters Republic of Korea Marine Corps was re-established; it was disbanded in October 1973 due to budget constraint.

2010s

On November 23, 2010,  the Bombardment of Yeonpyeong incident occurred. There was a rigorous engagement between the North Korean Army and a South Korean Marine Corps YP unit. As a result of this event, the South Korean government cancelled its Military Reform Plan 2020 which was to downsize the number of Marine Corps personnel deployed in North-West islands. Instead, the South Korean government established the Military Reform Plan 307 (Plan 307).

Plan 307 affected ROKMC by deploying new ARTHUR artillery hunting radar to North-West islands until February 2012.

With Plan 307, Northwest Islands Defense Command (NWIDC) was established on June 15, 2011. ROKMC Commandant holds an additional position as NWIDC commander. With NWIDC, ROKMC Commandant can command Army, Navy, Airforce under NWIDC branch in actual combat situation.

Plan 307 also includes a plan to fortify all 5 islands in the North-West area until 2015 by constructing bunkers for tanks, K-9 Thunder, K-10 ARV and civilians, digging trenches, establishing Guided-Missile unit which is equipped with 60 Spike missiles and 4 launchers, deploying the Hostile Artillery Locating System (HALO) which is manufactured by the Selex Galileo company, creating an AH-1S Cobra unit under the 6th Marine Brigade in Baengnyeongdo, increasing size of artillery units in Yeonpyeong from company to battalion which changed their number of K-9 Thunder from 6 to 18, deploying the K-SAM Chunma and the K-136 multiple rocket launcher to North-West islands and increasing numbers of marines in North-West islands by more than 1000.
On June 23, 2011, the South Korean National Assembly legislated a law that states the right that personnel management can be exercised by the ROKMC Commandant instead of the ROKN Chief of Naval Operations (Until 2011, the CNO exercised the latter), legislating the ROKMC Deputy Commandant, dividing and specifying ROKMC's main operation as 'amphibious operations' from ROKN 'naval operations', including the ROKMC Commandant as a formal member of the joint chiefs of the staff council, legislating the ROKMC Commandant as a member of the Defense Project Promotion Committee, giving him rights to select the uniform from CNO to the ROKMC Commandant and making the latter exercise the rights of the Management of Military Supplies of the ROKMC.

By dividing the ROKMC's main operation from ROKN, ROKMC made a stepping-stone to become a National Strategic Mobile Force.

On October 15, 2011, The law mentioned above took effect. ROKMC retrieved their record of service back from ROKN on October 13. ROKMC started issuing new uniforms since October 1. The ROKMC used to wear their own distinct uniforms before 1973, but after the ROKMC HQ were dissolved, South Korean marines had to wear uniforms similar to those used by the South Korean navy (sans the sailor caps). This new uniform is different from the new uniform of the ROKA, ROKN and the ROKAF (these 3 forces use same uniform). The new uniform was designed to camouflage marine personnel for amphibious operations by using colors of beach, sand and seaweed.

On June 4, 2012, Ministry of National Defense confirmed a plan to distribute 32 amphibious mobile helicopters to ROKMC. The ROKMC scheduled to activate an aviation group between 2017 and 2020 with 2 amphibious mobile helicopter battalions and 1 attack helicopter battalion with Colonel in chief.

Organization

The marine corps, with 29,000 personnel, is organized into two divisions and two brigades under the Headquarters Republic of Korea Marine Corps. The Commandant of the Republic of Korea Marine Corps is a three-star general. After the bombardment of Yeonpyeong, the Commandant of the ROKMC also holds the commander position of the NWIDC (Northwest Islands Defense Command). The 1st Marine Division can operate in sea, air, land, with specializing its three infantry battalions under a single regiment to Airborne/Amphibious Assault/Ranger. Furthermore, the ROKMC's Recon units (two Reconnaissance Battalions and one Reconnaissance Company) hold various special warfare trainings such as scuba and parachuting.

The ROKMC relies on the ROK Navy for medical treatment of its wounded, as specially trained Navy medics are to some extent integrated into the Marine Corps' units and also instructing fundamental first-aid techniques to new recruits (similar to the US Navy's Corpsmen).

Spartan 3000
In March 2016, the South Korean defense ministry announced the creation of a new "Spartan 3000" regiment consisting of 3,000 of South Korean marines. The unit will be combat ready to be deployed in any part of the Korean Peninsula within 24 hours in case of an attack from the DPRK forces and will be responsible for targeting high priority targets in North Korea including nuclear facilities. This new announcement also aims to make the ROK deployment strategy more efficient as it aims to be able to deploy a ROKMC regiment within 24 hours instead of the current 48 hours.

Order of battle

 Headquarters Republic of Korea Marine Corps/Northwest Islands Defense Command (대한민국 해병대사령부/서북도서방위사령부)
 Education and Training Group (교육훈련단)
 Special Reconnaissance Unit (특수수색대대) 
 Logistics Group (군수단)
 1st Marine Division (Sea-Dragon, 제1해병사단)
 Headquarters Battalion
 2nd Marine Brigade (Yellow-Dragon)
 21st Marine Battalion
 22nd Marine Battalion
 23rd Marine Battalion
 3rd Marine Brigade (King-Kong)
 31st Marine Battalion
 32nd Marine Battalion
 33rd Marine Battalion
 7th Marine Brigade (Warthog)
 71st Marine Battalion
 72nd Marine Battalion
 73rd Marine Battalion
 1st Marine Artillery Brigade (Phoenix): equipped with K55 SPH / K9A1
 2nd Marine Artillery Battalion
 3rd Marine Artillery Battalion
 7th Marine Artillery Battalion
 11th Marine Artillery Battalion
 1st Tank Battalion: equipped with K1 MBT
 1st Assault Amphibian Vehicle Battalion: equipped with KAAV7A1
 1st Reconnaissance Battalion
 1st Engineer Battalion
 1st Signal Battalion
 1st Supply Battalion
 1st Maintenance Battalion
 2nd Marine Division (Blue-Dragon, 제2해병사단)
 Headquarters Battalion
 1st Marine Brigade
 11th Marine Battalion
 12th Marine Battalion
 13th Marine Battalion
 5th Marine Brigade
 51st Marine Battalion
 52nd Marine Battalion
 53rd Marine Battalion
 8th Marine Brigade
 81st Marine Battalion
 82nd Marine Battalion
 83rd Marine Battalion
 2nd Marine Artillery Brigade: equipped with K55 SPH / K-9 Thunder
 Marine Artillery Battalion
 Marine Artillery Battalion
 Marine Artillery Battalion
 Marine Artillery Battalion
 2nd Tank Battalion: equipped with K1 MBT
 2nd Assault Amphibian Vehicle Battalion: equipped with KAAV7A1
 2nd Reconnaissance Battalion
 2nd Engineer Battalion
 2nd Signal Battalion
 2nd Supply Battalion
 2nd Maintenance Battalion
 6th Marine Brigade (Black-Dragon, 제6해병여단) on Baengnyeongdo island
 Headquarters Battalion
 61st Marine Battalion
 62nd Marine Battalion
 63rd Marine Battalion
 65th Marine Battalion
 6th Marine Artillery Battalion: equipped with K-9 Thunder / K-10 ARV
 6th Reconnaissance Company
 6th Engineer Company
 9th Marine Brigade (White-Dragon, 제9해병여단) on Jeju island
 Headquarters Battalion
 91st Marine Battalion
 92nd Marine Battalion
 93rd Marine Battalion
 Marine Artillery Battalion: equipped with K55 SPH / KH179 TH
 9th Engineer Company
 Yeon-Pyeong Unit on Yeonpyeong island
 Headquarters Battalion
 90th Marine Battalion
 9th Marine Artillery Battalion: equipped K-9 Thunder / K-10 ARV
 U-do Garrison Unit

Personnel

Ranks
In the South Korean armed forces, ranks fall into one of four categories: commissioned officer, warrant officer, non-commissioned officer, and junior enlisted, in decreasing order of authority.

Commissioned officer
Commissioned officer ranks are subdivided into -level (general) officers, -level (field-grade) officers, and -level (company-grade) officers.

Warrant officer
Warrant Officers fall in between non-commissioned and commissioned officers. The rank is denoted by a gold-colored  insignia.

Enlisted
In the South Korean armed forces, personnel with ranks of  through  are considered non-commissioned officers. There are enlisted ranks called "Corporal" and "Sergeant" in English, but they are not considered non-commissioned officer ranks, though they are treated as one if they hold an NCO position.

Equipment 
Acquisition plans are tied to Army procurement and focus on increasing tactical mobility, firepower, and command and control.

Until the mid-1990s, the ROKMC fleet of Amphibious Vehicles consisted of 61 Landing Vehicles Tracked (LVT) and 42 AAV7A1. In the early 1980s all Amtracs in ROKMC service were modified to LVTP7A1 standard, but the original variant remained for many more years in service. In an effort to replace the LVTs, the ROKMC undertook a 57 AAV7A1 co-production contract, later increased with an additional 67 AAV7A1 vehicles. Since 1998, South Korea had deployed these 124 new vehicles to enhance its defense against North Korea as well as replacing its current fleet consisting of obsolete vehicles.

The Marine Corps has no aircraft of its own, thus relying on aerial support from the Army and Navy. The service plans to create an aviation brigade with transport and KAI Surion attack helicopters by 2015. To strengthen its intelligence-gathering and surveillance capabilities, the service also is considering deploying unmanned aerial vehicles for reconnaissance.

The current M48A3K Main Battle Tanks are being replaced by around 50 to 60 K1 tanks. To support the force, K-55, K9 self-propelled howitzers and KH-179 towed howitzers are used.
The individual equipment may vary. The old ERDL type camouflage is still in use with training units, although it has been phased out largely by the ROKMC's new digital camouflage. The M-1956 Load-Carrying Equipment, alongside large backpacks (similar to the ALICE backpacks) are still used, though most units now have been issued newer, updated LCE gear or combat vests and often also body-armor/plate-carriers and modern rucksacks with MOLLE webbing.
The helmets in use are of the traditional steel-type (similar to the M1 and M80) and Kevlar helmets. Some units, such as Recon units, prefer the use of boonie hats.

In 2013, the ROKMC procured four Plasan Sandcat light protected vehicles with 67 Spike NLOS guided missiles.

By the end of 2017, ROK Marine Corps forces are to deploy the Bigung (flying arrow) guided rocket system near the Northern Limit Line (NLL) along the western sea border to protect the islands of Baengnyeong and Yeonpyeong from assault by North Korean hovercraft. Each system is capable of engaging multiple craft, with target acquisition and designation sights (TADS) and an uncooled infrared detector that can independently detect and track multiple targets simultaneously. Compared to coastal artillery, the system is more mobile and versatile, and can fire up to 36-40 rockets at once. The Agency for Defense Development partnered with LIG Nex1 for development and production.

Firearms 
 Daewoo K1A Carbine/SMG, issued to tank/helicopter/vehicle crews, some elite-units use K1As with aftermarket handguards, rail-systems and sights.
 Daewoo K2/K2C Standard-issue assault rifle, often used in conjunction with the K201 40mm grenade-launcher, Picatinny RIS issued to all Reconnaissance units, top-mounted Picatinny rails being issued to all active units
 Daewoo K3 Standard-issue LMG
 Daewoo K5 Standard handgun, issued to tank/helicopter crews and high-ranking officers
 Daewoo K7 Silenced SMG in use with some special units
 Daewoo K14 Sniper rifle in use with Recon units
 Steyr SSG 69 Sniper rifle used by some elite units
 Accuracy International AWM Sniper rifle used by some elite units
 Colt M16A1 Assault rifle, license-produced by (Daewoo) S&T Precision, used by some training units alongside the K2
 M1 Garand Semi-automatic battle rifle, used by honor guard only

See also

 Military of South Korea

References

External links
 ROKMC official website 
 ROKMC Guide (globalsecurity.org)

 
Republic of Korea Navy
South Korea
Military units and formations of South Korea in the Vietnam War
Military units and formations established in 1949